Parvularcula is a genus of marine bacteria.

References

Alphaproteobacteria
Bacteria genera